The 2010 Dulux Trade MSA British Rally Championship was the 52nd season of the British Rally Championship. The season consisted of six rounds and began on 27 March, with International Rally North Wales. The season ended on 25 September at the International Rally Yorkshire. Dulux Trade was the title sponsor of the series, which is part of a two-year deal agreed in February 2010.

Irishman Keith Cronin won the championship for the second year in a row in a Subaru Impreza, taking wins in both the Bulldog and Isle of Man rallies on the way to the title.

Calendar
The calendar consisted of six rounds as in 2009.

Drivers championship standings

References

External links
Official Website

British Rally Championship seasons
Rally Championship
British Rally Championship